Ángel Luis "Cholo" Espada Mangual (born February 2, 1948) is a Puerto Rican former professional boxer. He was the WBA's world Welterweight champion in 1975-76. A music lover, Espada also organized, during the late 1970s, a salsa orchestra.

Biography

Early career
Espada began his professional boxing career on March 11, 1967, with a defeat at the hands of future Antonio Cervantes world title challenger Josue Marquez, on a six-round decision, at San Juan. His next two fights were declared draws (ties). Both were against Luis Vinales.

After another defeat and a draw (both against Chris Fernandez), Espada got his first win. On April 1, 1968, he knocked out Linfer Contreras in the first round in San Juan. After one more win, he fought outside Puerto Rico for the first time, losing on points after six rounds to future Roberto Durán world title challenger Jimmy Robertson, on September 27, 1969, at Los Angeles, California.

His next fight would be against Bobby Joe Hughes, April 9, 1969 in San Juan. Hughes was disqualified for using illegal tactics during the fight, and this victory marked the beginning of  a fifteen fight winning streak for Espada. On November 7 of 1970, the streak was stopped by Matt Donovan, who beat him on points over ten rounds. Shortly after, Espada would beat former Emile Griffith world title challenger Manuel Gonzalez and lose to former world champion Eddie Perkins, both times, on points after ten rounds.

Between 1972 and 1975, Espada posted twelve wins in a row, including a victory over perennial world title challenger Armando Muniz, and a win in Panama. He was beaten by Luis Acosta in Caracas by decision in ten rounds to stop that winning streak, but he avenged the defeat against Acosta with a ten-round win over him in a rematch held in San Juan.

Champion
Espada became a world champion in a situation that could be described by some as bizarre: the undisputed world Welterweight champion of the era, José Nápoles, was to fight Carlos Monzón for the world's Middleweight title. The WBC kept recognizing Nápoles as their world Welterweight champion, but the WBA, feeling that Espada deserved a chance at Nápoles' crown, decided to strip Nápoles of the world championship because Nápoles went ahead as planned and fought Monzon. Thus, on June 28, 1975, Espada became the WBA's world Welterweight champion, and Puerto Rico's fourth world boxing champion in history, by outpointing the well known Canadian, Clyde Gray, over fifteen rounds in San Juan. Coincidentally, Espada won his world title the same day that Alfredo Escalera won the WBC world Junior Lightweight championship at a fight that took place in Japan; this was the first time two Puerto Ricans became world champions the same day and as a consequence, Puerto Rico, a country that had only produced two world boxing champions in its history, doubled their number of champions in one day with Espada and Escalera's victories. (In Spanish)

He retained the title with a fifteen-round decision over Johnny Gant, and won a non-title fight with an eighth-round knockout over Alfonzo Hayman.

On July 17, 1976, Espada fought what would have been the start of a Mexican boxing tour. Espada, looking forward to meeting Miguel Campanino, was instead faced with a boxer who had a record of 16-5 and who was named José Cuevas. Cuevas lifted the WBA world Welterweight title away from Espada with a second-round knockout.   They would fight again twice, with Cuevas retaining the title by ten and eleven-round knockouts.

Retirement from the Ring
Towards the end of his career, Espada, realizing his best days as a boxer had probably passed him by, announced on the Vea magazine that he was putting together a salsa orchestra. The "Cholo Espada orchestra" had some success in Puerto Rico, appearing on television shows constantly during the late 1970s and early 1980s.

Espada lost his last important fight, against Thomas Hearns, by a knockout in round four at the Joe Louis Arena, in Detroit, on March 2 of 1980. He then retired for a short period of time. Espada wanted to retire as a winner, however, and, after one year of inactivity, he made a one fight comeback, knocking out Julio Alfonso in four rounds, on December 10, 1981, in San Juan.

After retiring from boxing, Espada became a boxing trainer, and he has remained in that position ever since. Espada had a record of 44 wins, 11 losses and 3 draws, with 27 wins by knockout.

Professional boxing record

See also

List of world welterweight boxing champions
List of Puerto Rican boxing world champions
Sports in Puerto Rico
Afro–Puerto Ricans

References

External links

 

|-

1948 births
Living people
Puerto Rican male boxers
People from Salinas, Puerto Rico
Puerto Rican musicians
Salsa musicians
20th-century Puerto Rican male singers
Welterweight boxers
World welterweight boxing champions
World Boxing Association champions